Shirley is an unincorporated community in Washington County, in the U.S. state of Missouri.

The community is on Missouri Route 8 approximately six miles west of Potosi. Allen Branch flows through the community and enters the Sunnen Reservoir one mile to the north.

History
A post office called Shirley was established in 1894, and remained in operation until 1955. The community has the name of James Shirley, a local merchant.

Susan Cave (23WA190) was listed on the National Register of Historic Places in 1989.

References

Unincorporated communities in Washington County, Missouri
Unincorporated communities in Missouri